Grifola frondosa (also known as hen-of-the-woods,  in Japanese, ram's head or sheep's head) is a polypore mushroom that grows at the base of trees, particularly old growth oaks or maples. It is typically found in late summer to early autumn. It is native to China, Europe, and North America.

Description
Like the sulphur shelf mushroom, G. frondosa is a perennial fungus that often grows in the same place for several years in succession. It occurs most prolifically in the northeastern regions of the United States, but has been found as far west as Idaho.

G. frondosa grows from an underground tuber-like structure known as a sclerotium, about the size of a potato. The milky-white stipe (stalk) has a branchy structure and becomes tough as the mushroom matures.

Identification
This is a very distinct mushroom except for its cousin, the black staining mushroom, which is similar in taste but rubbery. Edible species which look similar to Grifola frondosa include Meripilus sumstinei (which stains black), Sparassis spathulata and Laetiporus sulphureus, another edible bracket fungus that is commonly called chicken of the woods or "sulphur shelf."

Uses
The species is a choice edible mushroom. Maitake has been consumed for centuries in China and Japan where it is one of the major culinary mushrooms. The mushroom is used in many Japanese dishes, such as nabemono. The softer caps must be thoroughly cooked.

Research
Although under laboratory and preliminary clinical research for many years, particularly for the possible biological effects of its polysaccharides, there are no completed, high-quality clinical studies for Grifola frondosa .

See also
 Medicinal fungi

References

External links
 

Edible fungi
Experimental cancer treatments
Fungi in cultivation
Fungi described in 1785
Fungi of Europe
Fungi of North America
Medicinal fungi
Meripilaceae
Taxa named by James Dickson (botanist)